William Skele may refer to:

William Skele I (died c. 1410), MP for Winchelsea
William Skele II (fl. 1395), MP for Winchelsea